Firemen's Memorial may refer to:

 Firemen's Memorial (Boston), 1909
 Firemen's Memorial (Manhattan), 1913